The 2009 Major League Soccer All-Star Game was the 14th annual MLS All-Star Game. The MLS All-Stars faced Everton of the Premier League on July 29, 2009. The match ended in a 1–1 draw at full-time and went to an immediate penalty shootout, which Everton won 4–3. Everton's Tim Howard--the United States first-choice goalkeeper and a former MetroStars player--was named MVP of the match, after making three saves during the shootout. This was the first win for an international club team in six tries against the MLS All-Stars, and remains Everton's last competitive trophy the club has won.

Host venue
Major League Soccer announced on July 9, 2008 that America First Field (then known as Rio Tinto Stadium), the League's newest soccer-specific venue, would host the 2009 MLS All-Star Game in the summer of 2009. MLS President Mark Abbott joined Real Salt Lake Owner David W. Checketts, Utah Governor Jon M. Huntsman, Jr., and Sandy Mayor Tom Dolan at a press conference at the new Stadium to officially announce the event. This was the first MLS All-Star Game held in Utah.

MLS All-Stars voting
Like the previous year, the MLS All-Star First XI was determined by an online fan voting system which accounted for 25% of the total vote, with players, coaches and general managers, and the media each holding 25% of the vote.  The fan voting period opened May 13, 2009 and ended July 6, 2009.  Two weeks into the fan voting period, Seattle Sounders FC players made up nine of the 11 top vote-getters, with Kasey Keller as the overall leader in total votes.

After the end of the voting period, Freddie Ljungberg received the most fan votes. The fan's first XI included Kasey Keller(Seattle), Chad Marshall (Columbus), Wilman Conde (Chicago), Geoff Cameron (Houston), Guillermo Barros Schelotto (Columbus), Stuart Holden (Houston), Freddie Ljungberg (Seattle), Shalrie Joseph (New England), Dwayne De Rosario (Toronto), Conor Casey (Colorado), and Landon Donovan (Los Angeles). The additional seven players were chosen by head coach Dominic Kinnear of Houston and the Commissioner Don Garber.

2009 MLS All-Star Game Rosters

Major League Soccer
The 2009 MLS All-Star First XI was announced in a special episode of MLSnet.com Extra Time, which aired 3 p.m. ET on Monday, July 13, 2009. On the following Monday, July 20, 2009, All-Star coach Dominic Kinnear and his assistants chose five additional players, with MLS Commissioner Don Garber adding the two final players to the 18-man roster. The All-Stars are:

As of July 26, 2009. Players in bold denotes First XI status.

^

&
♦
%

♣

♣
♣

♣
‡
♦
♣^
%
†

♣&

† - De Rosario was not available for the 2009 MLS All-Star game due to a Toronto FC CONCACAF Champions League game.

‡ - Blanco was chosen to take the place of De Rosario, being the next-highest vote getter in the midfield position.

♦ - "Commissioner's Picks", chosen by MLS Commissioner Don Garber.

♣ - Players selected by All-Star Coach Dominic Kinnear.

% - Johnson is an injury replacement for Joseph who suffered a bone bruise in his right knee.

& - Soumare was a replacement for Ching, who was rested after he competed in the 2009 CONCACAF Gold Cup with the US national team.

^ - Zach Thornton replaced Pat Onstad due to injury.

The following players fell short of the MLS All-Star First XI in voting:
Goalkeepers:
Pat Onstad - 2.09% Fan votes, 3.11% Player votes, 2.53% Media votes, 6.36% Coach/GM votes
Defenders:
Jhon Kennedy Hurtado - 5.42% Fan votes, 2.87% Player votes, 5.70% Media votes, 4.55% Coach/GM votes
Jonathan Bornstein - 1.80% Fan votes, 3.71% Player votes, 5.70% Media votes, 7.27% Coach/GM votes
Midfielders:
Cuauhtémoc Blanco - 3.93% Fan votes, 2.75% Player votes, 11.08% Media votes, 4.09% Coach/GM votes
Ricardo Clark - 2.03% Fan votes, 5.86% Player votes, 4.75% Media votes, 8.18% Coach/GM votes
Osvaldo Alonso - 5.34% Fan votes, 2.39% Player votes, 7.28% Media votes, 3.18% Coach/GM votes
Paulo Nagamura - 1.02% Fan votes, 4.67% Player votes, 2.85% Media votes, 9.55% Coach/GM votes
Forwards:
Fredy Montero - 6.39% Fan votes, 6.22% Player votes, 12.98% Media votes, 5.46% Coach/GM votes
Brian McBride - 3.40% Fan votes, 8.49% Player votes, 3.48% Media votes, 6.82% Coach/GM votes

Everton
As of July 12, 2009.

Match details

Statistics

Notes
 The 2009 Major League Soccer All-Star Game was the first to be played in the state of Utah.
 For the first time, AT&T was the official sponsor of the All-Star Game.
 This was the sixth time that the league's best players faced international competition in the MLS All-Star Game.
 The game was broadcast in the US on ESPN2 in English and TeleFutura in Spanish.
 This was the first All-Star match to be decided via penalty kicks.
 This was the first time the MLS All-Stars were defeated by an international opponent
 Early the next year, Landon Donovan would join Everton on a loan deal, and then again in early 2012.

References

MLS All-Star Game
Soccer in Utah
Mls All-Star Game 2009
All-Star Game
MLS All-Star
Sports competitions in Utah
Sandy, Utah
July 2009 sports events in the United States
MLS All-Star 2009